Act of Murder is a 1964 British crime drama film, directed by Alan Bridges. One of the Edgar Wallace Mysteries series, it was Bridges' first film as director.

Premise
An actor, Tim Ford, tries to persuade an ex-actress, Anne Longman, to return to the stage. Her husband, Ralph, suspects that Ford's motives are more than just professional.

Cast
 Anthony Bate as Ralph Longman
 John Carson as Tim Ford
 Justine Lord as Anne Longman 
 Duncan Lewis as Will Peterson
 Dandy Nichols as Maud Peterson
 Richard Burrell as John Quick

Critical reception
Film historians Steve Chibnall and Brian McFarlane said that on its release in the United Kingdom, the film "received pretty well uniformly positive reviews", especially for the directorial debut of Alan Bridges. The reviewer "T.M." in the Monthly Film Bulletin declared the film an "uncommonly intelligent little thriller", but noted that it was "just the sort of film which is likely to arouse critical sneers for reaching too high on a low budget." The reviewer added, "Long, languid close-ups a la Antonioni convey the dreamy sensuousness of the wife, the introspective quality which makes her react so strongly to the bizarre situation; abrupt cuts within speeches, from character to character, suggest very precisely the tensions that underlie the relations between husband, wife and lover right from the start."

Chibnall and McFarlane selected Act of Murder as one of the 15 most meritorious British B films made between World War II and 1970. They noted that "it picks its way through a web of obliquely suggested jealousy and a scam involving convincingly improbable frauds".

References

External links
 

1964 films
1964 crime drama films
British crime drama films
British black-and-white films
1960s English-language films
Films directed by Alan Bridges
British crime thriller films
Edgar Wallace Mysteries
1960s British films